Triphosa sabaudiata is a species of moth of the family Geometridae that can be found in Albania, Andorra, Austria, Bulgaria, France (including the islands of Corsica), Germany, Greece, Italy, Liechtenstein, Romania, Spain, Switzerland, Ukraine, and in all states of the former Yugoslavia. Besides its central European distribution, it can also be found in Asia.
29 August 2013

References

External links

Lepiforum.de

Moths described in 1830
Moths of Asia
Rheumapterini
Moths of Europe
Taxa named by Philogène Auguste Joseph Duponchel